The 2020 College Football Playoff National Championship was a college football bowl game that determined a national champion in the NCAA Division I Football Bowl Subdivision for the 2019 season. It was played at the Mercedes-Benz Superdome in New Orleans, Louisiana, on January 13, 2020, with kickoff at 8:00 p.m. EST (7:00 p.m. local CST) (which was the latest calendar date for the game until 2025) on ESPN. Aside from the all-star games that followed, this was the culminating game of the 2019–20 bowl season. Sponsored by telecommunications company AT&T, the game was officially known as the 2020 College Football Playoff National Championship presented by AT&T. 

The championship featured the winner of the Peach Bowl, the top-seeded LSU Tigers from the Southeastern Conference defeating the winner of the Fiesta Bowl, the third seed Clemson Tigers from the Atlantic Coast Conference by a score of 42–25. The win for LSU snapped Clemson's 29 game-winning streak and gave them their fourth national championship, their first in the College Football Playoff era, and becoming just the 2nd team to complete a perfect 15-0 season after Clemson doing the feat the season earlier. The next team to do this feat is the Georgia Bulldogs, completing it in the 2022 season. Clemson appeared in their fourth overall CFP National Championship game, tying them with Alabama for the most appearances by any team.

Background
Mercedes-Benz Superdome in New Orleans was announced as the host site for the sixth College Football Playoff National Championship on November 4, 2015. Playoff seedings and New Year's Six bowl matchups were announced on December 8, 2019.  This was the first of four consecutive College Football Playoff National Championship games matching the  3 seed and the No. 1 seed.

2020 College Football Playoff
The semifinals were played on December 28, 2019. At the Peach Bowl, for the first semifinal game, LSU routed Oklahoma 63-28. At the Fiesta Bowl for the second semifinal game, defending champion Clemson defeated Ohio State 29-23, after a pass meant for Chris Olave was intercepted in the endzone by Clemson cornerback Nolan Turner after a miscommunication.

Bracket

Teams
The game matched the LSU Tigers of the Southeastern Conference (SEC) and the Clemson Tigers of the Atlantic Coast Conference (ACC). With both teams entering the game with 14–0 records, the winning team's 15–0 record would equal that of the 2018 Clemson Tigers, becoming only the second team to finish 15–0 in a single season since the 1897 Penn Quakers.

LSU Tigers

LSU defeated Georgia in the SEC Championship Game on December 7, and received a bid to the Peach Bowl with the release of final CFP rankings on December 8. The Tigers defeated Oklahoma, 63–28, in the CFP semifinal Peach Bowl on December 28, which was LSU's first CFP semifinal appearance. The Tigers entered the championship game with a 14–0 record (8–0 in conference). LSU's most recent loss was to Texas A&M on November 24, 2018; a seven overtime contest. This was LSU's first appearance in a CFP National Championship game; their most recent national championship game appearance had been a loss to Alabama in the 2012 BCS National Championship Game.

Clemson Tigers

Clemson defeated Virginia in the ACC Championship Game on December 7, and received a bid to the Fiesta Bowl with the release of final CFP rankings on December 8. On December 28, the Tigers defeated Ohio State in the CFP semifinal Fiesta Bowl, 29–23. Clemson also entered the championship game with a 14–0 record (8–0 in conference). The Tigers' most recent loss had been to Alabama in the CFP semifinal Sugar Bowl on January 1, 2018; their 29 consecutive victories following that loss constituted one of the longest NCAA Division I football winning streaks of all time. Including national championship contests, this was Clemson's ninth overall CFP game, and they had a 6–2 record in prior CFP games. The Tigers were the defending champions, having defeated Alabama in the 2019 CFP National Championship.

Starting lineups

Both teams played a single set back offense as their primary offensive set. On defense, Clemson played out of the 4–3 defense, while LSU played a 3–4 defense.

Source:

Game summary

First half
LSU won the coin toss, and deferred possession to the second half, giving Clemson the opening kickoff. After a promising start to their opening drive, Clemson was forced to punt on 4th-and-23, giving LSU the ball on their own 7-yard-line. LSU's opening drive was far less productive, as they punted after three plays totaling a net loss of four yards. Clemson opened their ensuing drive on the LSU 45. A three-and-out followed, but the Clemson punt coverage team again came up big, downing the ball at the 4-yard-line. While the next LSU drive resulted in positive yards, a punt was the result, and Clemson took over at their own 33 and scored in five plays, opening the scoring with a Trevor Lawrence rushing touchdown 8:26 into the game. LSU opened their next drive with a touchback, and recorded a first down for the first time, but again punted, giving Clemson the ball at their own 25; Clemson punted right back, and LSU took over at their own 29. On this drive, the LSU offense moved the ball seventy yards in just 4 plays, capped by a long Joe Burrow pass to wide receiver Ja'Marr Chase, tying the game at seven with 2:20 remaining in the opening quarter. Clemson had possession for the remainder of the quarter, and made it to the LSU 42 before time expired.

Clemson ran three additional plays in the second quarter before settling for a 52-yard field goal, converted by placekicker B.T. Potter, giving them a 10–7 edge. Following LSU's fourth punt of the evening, Clemson started with their worst field position yet, as they got the ball at their own 4. This did not deter the Clemson offense, as they covered the ninety-six yards ahead of them in only four plays, capping the touchdown drive with a long run by Tee Higgins; this extended Clemson's lead to ten. LSU responded with a quick drive of their own, scoring in five plays to narrow the lead to three on a touchdown run by Burrow. Clemson's next drive ended in a punt, and LSU capitalized with another long touchdown drive to take their first lead of the contest, by four, with just over five minutes until halftime on another touchdown pass to Chase. Clemson was unable to respond on offense; they punted and LSU got the ball on their own 5-yard-line. Joe Burrow and the LSU offense continued to build their momentum with their third consecutive touchdown drive of 75-plus yards to increase the lead to 11, 28–17, on a pass to Thaddeus Moss, heading into halftime.

Second half

LSU opened the second half by receiving the kickoff; their ensuing drive resulted in a three-and-out, and Clemson took over on the 50-yard-line. For the first time in nearly an entire quarter, the Clemson offense found the end zone, as Travis Etienne capped a 6 play drive with his first touchdown of the day. Trevor Lawrence completed a pass to Amari Rodgers for the two-point conversion, cutting the LSU lead to three points. Joe Burrow's offense was again unable to produce on offense, and the second half (as did the first half) began with two three-and-outs for LSU. Clemson's next drive finished similarly, as a punt followed four plays totaling 14 yards. LSU took over on their own 32. On the fifth play of LSU's ensuing drive, Clemson starting middle linebacker James Skalski was ejected from the game for a targeting penalty; LSU scored on the next play on a touchdown pass from Burrow to Moss (one that gave Burrow sole possession of the FBS record for touchdown passes in a season with 59) to increase their lead to ten. Clemson couldn't produce on their next drive, and punted for the seventh time; LSU got the ball on their own 32. They drove to the Clemson 27 before attempting a 45-yard field goal, which Cade York missed wide right. Lawrence and the Clemson offense were unable to capitalize on the mistake, however; they went three-and-out and punted to the LSU 43. The quarter expired several plays later; LSU entered the fourth quarter leading 35–25.

LSU came out firing in the fourth quarter; they scored for just the second time this half on a Joe Burrow pass to Terrace Marshall Jr., his first receiving touchdown of the contest. For the fourth drive in a row, Clemson punted; the ball was downed at the LSU 10. After taking 5:24 off the clock, LSU punted the ball back, and Clemson took over with just under five minutes left, on their own 15. However, three plays later, Trevor Lawrence fumbled at the end of his rush; it was recovered by LSU's Derek Stingley Jr. with 3:53 to go. LSU was able to run the remaining time off the clock and finish the season as undefeated national champions, becoming the second 15-0 team in the modern era.

Scoring summary

Statistics

Source:

Broadcasting

The game was televised nationally by ESPN and called on ESPN Radio. For the sixth consecutive national championship, ESPN offered its Megacast coverage.
ESPN: Chris Fowler (play-by-play), Kirk Herbstreit (analyst), Maria Taylor (Clemson sideline), Tom Rinaldi (LSU sideline), Bill Lemonnier (rules analyst)
ESPN Radio: Sean McDonough (play-by-play), Todd Blackledge (analyst), Holly Rowe (LSU sideline), Ian Fitzsimmons (Clemson sideline); also available as Command Center audio.
ESPN2: Field Pass, Adam Amin and Steve Levy roam the sidelines with various guests, including ESPN analysts Pat McAfee and Dan Orlovsky.
ESPNU: Coaches Film Room, featuring discussion of the game with Vanderbilt coach Derek Mason, Oklahoma State coach Mike Gundy, TCU coach Gary Patterson, and former Ohio State defensive coordinator and new Boston College head coach Jeff Hafley.
ESPNews: Command Center, multiple camera views, which includes four different view points at one time with statistics and real-time drive charts, with audio from ESPN Radio broadcast.
ESPN Goal Line: DataCenter ESPN's main telecast surrounded by real-time statistics, analytics, social media commentary and player information; officially the network's last program, as the network was discontinued on June 30, 2020.
ACC Network: Hometown Radio Video overlaid with the radio call from the Clemson Tigers Sports Network; Don Munson (play-by-play), Tim Bourret (color commentary), Brad Scott (color), Reggie Merriweather (Clemson sideline).
SEC Network: Hometown Radio Video overlaid with the radio call from the LSU Sports Network; Chris Blair (play-by-play), Doug Moreau (analyst), Gordy Rush (LSU sideline).
ESPN Classic: Sounds of the Game features natural audio from the stadium, also includes band halftime performances. Not available as widely as most years due to several provider drops throughout 2019 as part of ESPN's purposeful wind-down of the network; a simulcast was offered on ESPN3.

See also
 College football national championships in NCAA Division I FBS

Notes

References

External links
 Game statistics at statbroadcast.com

College Football Playoff National Championship
National Championship
Clemson Tigers football bowl games
LSU Tigers football bowl games
January 2020 sports events in the United States
2020 in sports in Louisiana
American football competitions in New Orleans